In enzymology, a hydroxynitrilase is an enzyme that catalyzes the chemical reaction

acetone cyanohydrin  cyanide + acetone

Hence, this enzyme has one substrate, acetone cyanohydrin, and two products, cyanide and acetone.

This enzyme belongs to the family of lyases, specifically the aldehyde-lyases, which cleave carbon-carbon bonds.  The systematic name of this enzyme class is acetone-cyanohydrin acetone-lyase (cyanide-forming). Other names in common use include alpha-hydroxynitrile lyase, hydroxynitrile lyase, acetone-cyanhydrin lyase [mis-spelt], acetone-cyanohydrin acetone-lyase, oxynitrilase, 2-hydroxyisobutyronitrile acetone-lyase, 2-hydroxyisobutyronitrile acetone-lyase (cyanide-forming), and acetone-cyanohydrin lyase.

References

 
 

EC 4.1.2
Enzymes of unknown structure